4'-Methoxy-α-pyrrolidinopentiophenone (also known as O-2417, 4-MeO-α-PVP and MOPVP) is a stimulant drug of the cathinone class that has been sold online as a designer drug.

Legal Status

As of October 2015 4-MeO-α-PVP is a controlled substance in China.

See also 
 4Cl-PVP
 4F-PVP
 4-Et-PVP
 alpha-Pyrrolidinopentiophenone
 4'-Methoxy-α-pyrrolidinopropiophenone
 DMPVP
 MDPV
 Pyrovalerone

References 

Designer drugs
Norepinephrine–dopamine reuptake inhibitors
Pyrrolidinophenones
Propyl compounds